Dávid Mohl (born 22 April 1985) is a Hungarian footballer who plays as a left back for Fehérvár II.

Club statistics

Updated to games played as of 19 May 2019.

References

External links
 Profile
 

1985 births
Living people
Sportspeople from Székesfehérvár
Hungarian footballers
Hungary youth international footballers
Association football defenders
FC Admira Wacker Mödling players
Fehérvár FC players
Debreceni VSC players
Kecskeméti TE players
Pécsi MFC players
Újpest FC players
Szombathelyi Haladás footballers
Szeged-Csanád Grosics Akadémia footballers
Austrian Football Bundesliga players
Nemzeti Bajnokság I players
Nemzeti Bajnokság II players
Nemzeti Bajnokság III players
Hungarian expatriate footballers
Expatriate footballers in Austria
Hungarian expatriate sportspeople in Austria